The Belt and Road construction leadership group (also called Leading Group for Promoting the Belt and Road Initiative) is the State Council review and coordination body established by the State Council of the People's Republic of China to promote the construction of the Silk Road Economic Belt and the 21st Century Maritime Silk Road. State Council leader Han Zheng is the core and the China National Development and Reform Commission is the main body. This promotion plan connects many continents and oceans and has officially started.

History
In September and October 2013, Xi Jinping, during his visit to Central Asia and Southeast Asian countries, proposed the "Silk Road Economic Belts" and the "21st Century Maritime Silk Road" initiatives. The eighth meeting of the CPC Central Committee Financial and Economic Leading Group, held in November 2014, proposed to accelerate the construction of the Silk Road Economic Belt and the 21st Century Maritime Silk Road, and to plan the top-level design for the "Belt and Road" project.

On February 1, 2015, the Standing Committee of the Political Bureau of the CPC Central Committee and vice premier of the State Council Zhang Gaoli began to promote the "one belt and one road" construction work conference in Beijing.

Constituent personnel 
The original members of the Leading Group were:
Zhang Gaoli (Deputy Premier of the State Council)
 Deputy head Wang Huning (Director of the Policy Research Office of the CPC Central Committee and Director of the Office of the Central Comprehensive Deepening Reform Leading Group)
Yang Jing (State Councilor and Secretary General of the State Council)
Yang Jiechi (State Councilor, Director of the Office of the Leading Group of the Central Foreign Affairs Work)

The personnel in 2018 were:
 Team leader Han Zheng (Deputy Premier of the State Council)
 Deputy head Yang Jiechi (Director of the Office of the Central Foreign Affairs Working Committee)
Hu Chunhua (Deputy Premier of the State Council)
Xiao Jie (State Councilor and Secretary General of the State Council)
He Lifeng (Director of the National Development and Reform Commission)

Office 
The leading group for promoting the initiative set up an office located in the National Development and Reform Commission. The commission was to undertake the daily work of the leading group.

Directors 
 Xu Shaoshi (2015-2017, Director of the National Development and Reform Commission)
He Lifeng (2017—Director of the National Development and Reform Commission)

Deputy directors 
He Lifeng (2015-2017, deputy director of the National Development and Reform Commission)
Ning Jizhe (2015—Deputy Minister of Commerce)
Zhang Jun (2018 - Assistant Foreign Minister)

See also 
 Silk Road
State Council of the People's Republic of China 
National Development and Reform Commission

References 

Belt and Road Initiative
2015 establishments in China